Víctor Ulloa is a Peruvian football goalkeeper, who as of 2020, plays for Peruvian Segunda División club Unión Comercio.

In 2008, he was promoted to Sporting Cristal's first team.

References

Living people
Association football goalkeepers
Peruvian footballers
Sporting Cristal footballers
1991 births